Andreas Seiferth (born 23 June 1989) is a German basketball player who last played for Medi Bayreuth of the Basketball Bundesliga (BBL). Standing at 2.09 m (6 ft 10 in), Seiferth usually plays as center.

Professional career
On 1 August 2016, Seiferth signed with Medi Bayreuth of the Basketball Bundesliga (BBL). He averaged 11.2 points and 3.7 rebounds per game during the 2019-20 season. Seiferth re-signed with the team for two years on 10 July 2020.

International career
Since 2012, Seiferth has played for the German national basketball team.

Personal
Andreas' brother, Martin Seiferth, is a professional basketball player as well.

References

1989 births
Living people
Alba Berlin players
Artland Dragons players
Centers (basketball)
FC Bayern Munich basketball players
German men's basketball players
Medi Bayreuth players